Kajaani Airport  is an airport in Paltaniemi, Kajaani, Finland, approximately  northwest of Kajaani city centre.

History
Construction of the airport began in 1939 with the runway being completed in the autumn. However, because of the outbreak of World War II it would not be until the 22 June 1956 that the airport would be officially opened.

Airlines and destinations
The following airlines operate regular scheduled and charter flights at Kajaani Airport:

Statistics

Awards 
The airport was Finavia airport of the year in 1994, 1997 and 2007.

Ground transportation

See also 
List of the largest airports in the Nordic countries

References

External links

 Finavia – Kajaani Airport
 AIP Finland – Kajaani Airport
 
 
 

Airports in Finland
Airport
Buildings and structures in Kainuu